Mittry Lake is located in the Mittry Lake Wildlife Area, just north of Yuma, Arizona, on the Lower Colorado River. It is located in between the upstream Imperial Dam and the downstream Laguna Dam. The lake has undergone rehabilitation work including marsh dredging, revegetation and fish habitat improvement, making it a great location for small game hunting and sport fishing. It is public land managed by the Arizona Game and Fish Department, the Bureau of Reclamation and the Bureau of Land Management, and available to the public for recreational purposes.

La Laguna
La Laguna was a mining town that was in existence for a short time from 1860 to 1862.  The town had a few merchants and a ferry across the Colorado River that served placer miners in the vicinity. When the La Paz gold rush began, La Laguna was abandoned. Its former site now lies beneath Mittry Lake.

Fish species

 Largemouth Bass
 Crappie
 Bullhead catfish
 Catfish (Channel)
 Catfish (Flathead)
 Tilapia
 Redear Sunfish
 Green Sunfish
 Bluegill Sunfish
 Carp
 Bullfrogs

See also
 List of lakes in Arizona

References

External links
 Mittry Lake Wildlife Area at the Bureau of Land Management
 Mittry Lake Wildlife Area at the Arizona Game and Fish Department
  Ghost Towns of Arizona – La Laguna

Wildlife areas of Arizona
Reservoirs in Yuma County, Arizona
Bureau of Land Management areas in Arizona
Reservoirs in Arizona